Japeuthria is a monospecific genus of sea snails, marine gastropod mollusks in the family Buccinidae, the true whelks.

Species
Species within the genus Japeuthria include:
 Japeuthria ferrea (Reeve, 1847)

References

External links
 

Buccinidae
Monotypic gastropod genera